= Gloria Pampillo =

Argentinian writer (1938–2013)

Gloria Pampillo (1938–2013) was an Argentine writer.

== Biography ==
Born in Buenos Aires, Argentina, she moved to Spain where she worked as a teacher. She later came back to teach at the Universidad de Buenos Aires, where she ran writing workshops with Maite Alvarado. She also cofounded Sudestada, a writers' association.

Among her best-known works are the novels Las invenciones inglesas, Costanera Sur, Pegamento and La deuda (winner of the 2º Premio de Novela de la Biblioteca Nacional). She also published the short story collections Estimado Lerner and Cuatro viajes y un prostíbulo. The novel Una mala mujer was published posthumously.

She also published several books on the theory and practice of writing, among Escribir, Yo no sabía que sabía, Sobre narración, teoría y práctica. Permítame que le cuente una historia and notably Una araña en el zapato. Lastly, she wrote a number of books for younger readers: Palabrelío, Avestruces y Piratas and La mula en el andén.
